Kanchhi Maya Koju (born 3 February 1981) is a Nepalese middle-distance runner. She competed in the women's 1500 metres at the 2004 Summer Olympics.

References

External links
 

1981 births
Living people
Athletes (track and field) at the 2004 Summer Olympics
Nepalese female middle-distance runners
Olympic athletes of Nepal
Place of birth missing (living people)
Athletes (track and field) at the 1998 Asian Games
Athletes (track and field) at the 2006 Asian Games
Athletes (track and field) at the 2010 Asian Games
Athletes (track and field) at the 2014 Asian Games
Asian Games competitors for Nepal
21st-century Nepalese women